I'm Tryin' to Get Home is an album by American trumpeter Donald Byrd featuring performances by Byrd with a large brass section and vocalists recorded in 1964 and released on the Blue Note label in 1965 as BLP 4188.

Reception
The Allmusic review by Scott Yanow awarded the album 2 stars and stated "despite some strong moments, the date (which resulted in no real hits) does not quite reach the heights of A New Perspective although it has plenty of interesting moments". The Penguin Guide to Jazz noted the album's popularity and its being a precursor of Byrd's further success in the following decade, but described it as "dispensable".

Track listing
All compositions by Donald Byrd except as indicated

 "Brother Isaac" - 4:54
 "Noah" (Duke Pearson) - 6:59
 "I'm Tryin' to Get Home" - 7:01
 "I've Longed and Searched for My Mother" - 8:35
 "March Children" (Pearson) - 7:17
 "Pearly Gates" (Pearson) - 2:05

Recorded on December 17 (#1, 3, 5) & December 18 (#2, 4, 6), 1964.

Personnel
Donald Byrd - trumpet, flugelhorn
Joe Ferrante, Jimmy Owens, Ernie Royal, Clark Terry, Snooky Young - trumpet
Jimmy Cleveland, Henry Coker, J.J. Johnson, Benny Powell - trombone
Jim Buffington, Bob Northern - french horn
Don Butterfield - tuba
Stanley Turrentine - tenor saxophone
Herbie Hancock - piano
Freddie Roach - organ
Grant Green - guitar
Bob Cranshaw - bass
Grady Tate - drums
Duke Pearson - arranger
Coleridge Perkinson - director, conductor
Unidentified musicians - percussion
Unidentified chorus - vocals

References

1965 albums
Albums arranged by Duke Pearson
Albums produced by Duke Pearson
Albums recorded at Van Gelder Studio
Blue Note Records albums
Donald Byrd albums